This is a list of Members of Parliament (MPs) who were a part of the Interim Assembly of the Republic which met 4 times awaiting the formation of the Founding Parliament of the Turkish Republic of Northern Cyprus following the establishment of the Turkish Republic of Northern Cyprus. All 40 elected members of the interim assembly were coming from the Federated Assembly. These members were elected at the 1981 parliamentary election, which was held on 28 June 1981.

The tenure of office of this parliament was from 15 November 1983 to 6 December 1983.

Presidential Committee 
The same presidential committee continued to its office from the last Federated Assembly.

Members

Lefkoşa

Gazimağusa

Girne

References 

Members of the Assembly of the Republic (Northern Cyprus)